Jardim Paulistano is a quarter of the city of Campina Grande, Paraíba, Brazil. It is in the South Zone of the city.

Neighboring quarters
 Liberdade, to the north
 Cruzeiro, to the west
 Distrito Industrial, to the south
 Tambor, to the east

References

Neighbourhoods in Campina Grande